Edward Frank "Moe" Burtschy (April 18, 1922 – May 2, 2004) was an American right-handed relief pitcher in Major League Baseball (MLB) who played for the Philadelphia / Kansas City Athletics (1950, 1951, 1954–56).

He was born in Cincinnati. Following his military service, he returned to the minors in 1946, and, on June 17, 1950, he made his debut in the American League with the Athletics. Burtschy made the only start of his MLB career that year on August 1 against the Chicago White Sox at Comiskey Park; he allowed seven hits and six earned runs in 2 innings pitched, and absorbed the 8–1 defeat, his only big-league decision of the 1950 season. He missed much of the 1951 season with elbow surgery, and was assigned to Triple-A for all of 1952 and 1953.

In 46 games pitched, tied for fifth in the American League, Burtschy won five, lost four, and notched four saves for the 54th and last Philadelphia Athletics team. In one unusual appearance, on June 26, 1954, Burtschy replaced Dutch Romberger in the tenth inning of an Athletics game against the Baltimore Orioles. He walked Chuck Diering intentionally to load the bases. He then pitched wildly to Gil Coan which scored Dick Kryhoski with the winning run.

He put up a 3–1 record in 21 games during the season's early weeks, hurling for a second-division team. On May 29, 1956, he pitched two innings of hitless relief against the White Sox, then fell apart in the 12th, yielding three walks and a sacrifice to give Chicago a 7–4 win. His last appearance for the Athletics came on June 9; despite facing the minimum three batters and holding Baltimore off the scoreboard, he allowed two hits, but each Oriole baserunner was erased caught stealing on throws from Athletics' catcher Joe Ginsberg. Five days later, he was traded with outfielder Bill Renna to the New York Yankees in a four-player deal that brought veteran first baseman Eddie Robinson back to the Athletics. The Yankees sent Burtschy back to Triple-A, where he played for two years before retiring from the game.

In his 90-game MLB career, Burtschy compiled a 10–6 record, with 97 strikeouts, a 4.71 ERA, and four saves in 185 innings pitched. After retiring, he worked as a freight salesman in the trucking industry.

In November 1999 Burtschy joined Lou Limmer, Gus Zernial, Forrest "Spook" Jacobs, Joe Astroth, Art Ditmar and Joe DeMaestri for a reunion of members of the 1954 Philadelphia Athletics. The event was organized by the Philadelphia Athletics Historical Society.

Moe Burtschy died of heart failure in Delhi Township, Ohio at the age of 82.

References

External links

 Moe Burtschy - Baseballbiography.com

1922 births
2004 deaths
Anniston Rams players
Baseball players from Cincinnati
Birmingham Barons players
Buffalo Bisons (minor league) players
Columbia Reds players
Columbus Jets players
Dayton Ducks players
Denver Bears players
Kansas City Athletics players
Lincoln A's players
Major League Baseball pitchers
Ottawa A's players
Philadelphia Athletics players
Portland Beavers players
Richmond Virginians (minor league) players
Savannah Indians players
United States Navy personnel of World War II